The Primera División de Baloncesto is the fifth level in the Spanish basketball league system.

Current format
The Primera División works similar to the Tercera División of Spanish football. It is divided into fourteen groups, corresponding to the Autonomous communities of Spain excepting two of the groups: one that is shared by Basque Country, La Rioja and Navarra. In Catalonia known as Copa Catalunya.

The best teams are promoted to Liga EBA, some of them without playing any promotion playoffs with other groups. In some Autonomous communities, the first qualified is considered the Regional amateur champion.

Latest seasons

Andalusia, Ceuta and Melilla

Aragón

Asturias

Source:

Balearic Islands

Basque Country, Navarra, La Rioja

Canary Islands

Cantabria

Source:

Castile and León

Source:

Castile-La Mancha

Catalonia
Competition known as Copa Catalunya

Community of Madrid
{| class="wikitable"
|-
! Season !! Champion !! Runner-up
|-
| 2005–06 || Ciudad de Móstoles CB || Baloncesto Pozuelo
|-
| 2006–07 || Baloncesto Fuenlabrada B || Torrelodones AD
|-
| 2007–08 || Eurocolegio Casvi || Baloncesto Alcobendas
|-
| 2008–09 || Alcorcón CB || Baloncesto Pozuelo
|-
| 2009–10 || Torrelodones AD || Baloncesto Torrejón
|-
| 2010–11 || CB San Agustín del Guadalix || Baloncesto Getafe
|-
| 2011–12 || Baloncesto Pozuelo || CD Covibar
|-
| 2012–13 || Estudio CD || CB Ciudad de Móstoles
|-
| 2013–14 || Baloncesto Pozuelo || Alcorcón Basket
|-
| 2014–15 || Torrelodones AD || Real Canoe NC
|-
| 2015–16 || Uros de Rivas || Eurocolegio Casvi
|-
| 2016–17 || Liceo Francés || Estudio CD
|-
| 2017–18 || Zentro CB || Baloncesto Pozuelo
|-
| 2018–19 || Baloncesto Alcalá || Distrito Olímpico

Extremadura

Galicia

Region of Murcia
Since 2013, the Region of Murcia has an independent group.

Source:

Valencian Community
Until 2013, the group was shared with the Region of Murcia.

References

5